Micheál Ó Síoda was an Irish scribe and folklorist.

Ó Síoda was a native of Carnmore, and knowledgeable about the history of the parish of Lackagh-Turloughmore in County Galway. He was an especial authority on the Fair of Turloughmore, and its accompanying faction fights. Much of his material has found its way into print in local history books.

In 1909 he wrote a book called Leahar na nAmhrán, which included handwritten songs received from Pádhraic Ó Comáin of Cregmore. A copy, by Ciarán Bairéad, is kept at the Department of Irish Folklore at University College Dublin, along with interviews of Ó Síoda.

References

 In Their Own Words: The Parish of Lackagh-Turloughmore and its People, ed. Liz Blackmore, John Cronin, Donal Ferrie and Brid Higgins, Galway, 2001. .

People from County Galway
Irish writers
20th-century Irish people
Irish-language writers